"Joseph, Better You Than Me" is a song by Las Vegas-based rock band The Killers featuring English musicians Elton John and Neil Tennant. All proceeds from the song benefit the Product Red campaign, headed by Bono and Bobby Shriver. The music video features footage from The Living Christ series.

The song continued the tradition of The Killers releasing a digital download Christmas single that started with "A Great Big Sled" in 2006 and continued with "Don't Shoot Me Santa" in 2007. Lead singer Brandon Flowers said it was great to work with two "real professionals" and "would love to work with them again".

The song speaks of Saint Joseph, the adoptive father of Jesus. Flowers, John, and Tennant take turns in describing the difficulties that he must have felt being a father to Jesus. They also sing of the public attention Joseph would have received.

Track listing
"Joseph, Better You Than Me" - 4:53

Charts

References

The Killers songs
American Christmas songs
Christmas charity singles
2008 singles
Songs with music by Elton John
Songs written by Neil Tennant
Songs written by Brandon Flowers
Song recordings produced by Stuart Price
2008 songs
Island Records singles
Elton John songs
Songs about fathers